Čáslav is a town in Kutná Hora District in the Central Bohemian Region of the Czech Republic. It has about 10,000 inhabitants. The town centre is well preserved and is protected by law as an urban monument zone.

Administrative parts

Čáslav is made up of town parts of Čáslav-Nové Město ("New Town") and Čáslav-Staré Město ("Old Town"), and of village of Filipov.

Geography
It lies in a flat agricultural landscape of the Central Elbe Table lowland. The Brslenka stream flows through the town and supplies several ponds, including Podměstský in the town centre.

History
The history of Čáslav begins in the 9th century with the founding of a gord and settlement called Hrádek. In the 11th century, it became a Přemyslid administrative centre. A new royal town with a huge square was founded by King Ottokar II of Bohemia next to Hrádek in around 1250. In 1421, Bohemian parliament debated in Čáslav and voted in a new Hussite government.

Two large fires in 1452 and 1522 severely damaged the town. During the Thirty Years' War, in 1639 and 1642, Čáslav was devastated and burnt down by Swedish troops. The town however recovered and in 1715, Čáslav became the centre of a region.

Jewish population
From the 14th century there was a Jewish settlement in Čáslav, but in the 15th century the Jews were expelled. In the middle of the 19th century, only one Jewish family lived in the town. After the equality of the Jews in 1867, many from the area moved to the town of Čáslav. Around 1893, 245 Jews lived in the town, which was about 1–2% of the population.

Demographics

Sights

The Church of Saints Peter and Paul is an early Gothic building from the end of the 13th century. The building included the Romanesque Church of St. Michael from the 11th century (today's sacristy), which originally stood here.

The town area was delimited by walls, which are preserved in one third of their original length. A unique monument of the Čáslav Gothic fortifications is the cylindrical Otakar's Tower, which stood at the Brod Gate.

Čáslav Town Museum, one of the oldest regional museums in Bohemia, was founded in 1864. Its building is from 1884.

The synagogue was built between 1899 and 1900 in Moorish style, designed by architect Wilhelm Stiassny. It was used until 1939 by the local Jewish community, which was then almost totally wiped out during The Holocaust. After World War II the abandoned building saw use as a warehouse, and then (between 1970–1989) as a gallery. In 1994, however, it was returned to the Jewish Community in Prague and has recently been restored.

In 1910, part of the skull of famous Hussite general Jan Žižka was discovered in Čáslav parish church. The skull is exhibited in Žižka's Hall of Čáslav Town Hall.

Sport
Čáslav is sometimes called a town of majorettes, because of the local team, which won medals from Czech and world competitions.

The town's football club, FK Čáslav, plays on the fourth tier of the Czech football system.

Notable is the Athletics Club Čáslav. Two of its most known sportswomen are Ludmila Formanová and Jarmila Kratochvílová, both World Champions in 800 m sprint.

Air base
To the northeast of the town, there is an active air base of the Czech Air Force.

Notable people

Jan Ladislav Dussek (1760–1812), composer and pianist
Jan Karafiát (1846—1929), calvinistic priest and children writer
Antonín Chittussi (1847–1891), Impressionist painter
Rudolf Těsnohlídek (1882–1928), writer  
Jiří Mahen (1882–1939), writer
František Moravec (1895–1966), military intelligence officer
Josef Svoboda (1920–2002), scenographer
Eli Urbanová (1922–2012), poet, novelist and Esperantist
Antonín Rükl (1932–2016), astronomer
Miloš Forman (1932–2018), film director
Jarmila Kratochvílová (born 1951), athlete
Ludmila Formanová (born 1974), athlete
David Jarolím (born 1979), footballer

Twin towns – sister cities

Čáslav is twinned with:
 Opfikon, Switzerland

References

External links

Virtual show

Populated places in Kutná Hora District
Cities and towns in the Czech Republic
Shtetls